(New) Juksan Ahn clan was one of the Korean clans. Their Bon-gwan was in Anseong, Gyeonggi Province. According to the Korean census in 2015, the number of the (new) Juksan Ahn clan was 77,026. It has been told that (new) Juksan Ahn clan's founder was  who came over from Tang dynasty to Silla in 807. However, according to Ssijogwonryu, it has been found that the (new) Juksan Ahn clan ‘s founder was Ahn Jun and Ahn Yeong-ui. Genealogies of Ahn Jun and Ahn Yeong-ui are still unknown. Not to be confused with the another Juksan Ahn clan, whose founder is Ahn Bang-jun.

Connected Members 
 Royal Consort Jeong-bi — concubine of King Gongmin
 Royal Consort Hyeon-bi — concubine of King U, paternal niece of Royal Consort Jeong-bi
 Ahn Maeng-dam — husband of Princess Jeongui, second daughter of Queen Soheon and King Sejong 
 Princess Consort Yeongwon — wife of Yi Yeom, Prince Hwisun, the fifth son of King Seongjong 
 Ahn Hong-ryang — son-in-law of Yi Hu, Prince Shinseong, the fourth son of King Seonjo

See also 
 Korean clan names of foreign origin

References

External links 
 

Korean clan names of Chinese origin